Vladislav Aleksandrovich Karapuzov (born 6 January 2000) is a Russian football player. He plays as a right winger for Akhmat Grozny on loan from FC Dynamo Moscow.

Club career
He played in the 2018–19 UEFA Youth League with FC Lokomotiv Moscow.

After his contract with FC Lokomotiv Moscow expired in the summer of 2019, he was close to signing with Valencia, but the contract offer fell through. He signed with FC Dynamo Moscow on 27 August 2019.

He made his debut in the Russian Premier League for FC Dynamo Moscow on 27 June 2020 in a game against PFC CSKA Moscow, as a starter.

On 21 February 2021, he joined FC Tambov on loan until the end of the 2020–21 season. On 24 July 2021, he moved on loan to FC Akhmat Grozny for the 2021–22 season.

On 8 August 2022, Karapuzov extended his contract with Dynamo to 2025. On 8 September 2022, Karapuzov returned to Akhmat Grozny on a new loan until the end of the 2022–23 season.

Career statistics

References

External links
 
 
 

2000 births
People from Norilsk
Living people
Russian footballers
Russia youth international footballers
Russia under-21 international footballers
Association football midfielders
FC Lokomotiv Moscow players
FC Dynamo Moscow players
FC Tambov players
FC Akhmat Grozny players
Russian Premier League players
Russian Second League players
Sportspeople from Krasnoyarsk Krai